The 1922 Akron football team was an American football team that represented the University of Akron in the Ohio Athletic Conference (OAC) during the 1922 college football season. In its eighth season under head coach Fred Sefton, the team compiled a 5–3 record and outscored opponents by a total of 141 to 53. Quarterback Clarence Bliley was the team captain.

Schedule

References

Akron
Akron Zips football seasons
Akron football